The Quincy Savings Bank building is a historic bank building at 1372 Hancock Street in Quincy, Massachusetts.  Built in 1897, this four-story brick Classical Revival building is one of only two surviving 19th century commercial buildings in Quincy Center.  Distinctive features include the granite quoining at the corners, and entrance portico with doubled Doric columns and a granite pediment.  It was the fourth home for the bank, which was founded in 1845.  Quincy Savings Bank was acquired by Citizens Bank in 1995.

The building was listed on the National Register of Historic Places in 1989.

See also
National Register of Historic Places listings in Quincy, Massachusetts

References

Bank buildings on the National Register of Historic Places in Massachusetts
Neoclassical architecture in Massachusetts
Commercial buildings completed in 1897
Buildings and structures in Quincy, Massachusetts
National Register of Historic Places in Quincy, Massachusetts
1897 establishments in Massachusetts